Environmental Philosophy is a peer-reviewed academic journal that publishes articles, reviews, and discussions relevant to all areas of environmental philosophy. The journal was established in 2004 and is edited by Ted Toadvine at Penn State University. It is sponsored by the International Association for Environmental Philosophy and published by the Philosophy Documentation Center. The journal is published twice yearly in May and November issues.

Abstracting and indexing 
Environmental Philosophy is abstracted and indexed in:

 ERIH PLUS
 Environment Index
 Norwegian Register for Scientific Journals
 Philosopher's Index
 PhilPapers
 Publication Forum

See also 
 List of philosophy journals
 List of environmental journals

References

External links 
 

English-language journals
Publications established in 2004
Biannual journals
Philosophy journals
University of Oregon
Environmental studies journals
Environmental humanities journals
2004 establishments in Oregon
Environmental philosophy
Philosophy Documentation Center academic journals